Paula Tretkoff (née Paula Beazley Cohen) is an Australian-American mathematician who studies number theory, noncommutative geometry, and hypergeometric functions.
She is a professor of mathematics at Texas A&M University, and a director of research at the Centre national de la recherche scientifique (CNRS) associated with the University of Lille.

Education and career
Tretkoff was born in Sydney, Australia, but is a US citizen. She studied mathematics at the University of Sydney, earning first class honours in applied mathematics in 1978 and in pure mathematics in 1979. She completed her Ph.D. in 1985 at the University of Nottingham, in England. Her dissertation, Height Problems and Modular Forms, was supervised by David Masser. She completed a habilitation in 1995 at Pierre and Marie Curie University.

Tretkoff joined CNRS as a researcher in 1983, associated with Pierre and Marie Curie University. She moved to Lille, and became a director of research, in 1995. In 2002 she took up her present position as a professor at Texas A&M, while retaining her position at CNRS.

Books
Tretkoff is the author of two books:
Complex Ball Quotients and Line Arrangements in the Projective Plane (Princeton Univ. Press, 2016)
Periods and Special Functions in Transcendence (World Scientific, 2017)

References

External links
Home page

Year of birth missing (living people)
Living people
Australian mathematicians
20th-century American mathematicians
21st-century American mathematicians
American women mathematicians
University of Sydney alumni
Alumni of the University of Nottingham
Texas A&M University faculty
20th-century women mathematicians
21st-century women mathematicians
20th-century American women
21st-century American women
Research directors of the French National Centre for Scientific Research